Grover Beach station is a passenger rail station in the city of Grover Beach, California. It is served by two daily Amtrak Pacific Surfliner round trips

The station opened on November 10, 1996 at a cost of $1.6 million. The project was coordinated by Caltrans, Amtrak and the city of Grover Beach with funding from State Transit Capital Improvement and Proposition 116 bonds.

References

External links 

Amtrak stations in San Luis Obispo County, California
Railway stations in the United States opened in 1996
1996 establishments in California